St Andrew's Church is a Church of England parish church in Haughton-le-Skerne, Darlington. The church is a Grade I listed building.

History
The church was originally built in the 12th century and restored in the 15th century. In 1795, it was expanded with the addition of transepts, a vestry and a south porch. Notable original features include Norman windows, pews, a pulpit and lectern that date to 1662 (the year of the Act of Uniformity), and a 15th-century font cover. It is the oldest church in Darlington.

Present day
On 28 April 1952, the church was designated a Grade I listed building.

From 1993 to 2009, St Andrew's was associated with a church plant in a local school: having been closed because of a lack of leadership, the plant merged back into St Andrew's. The church stands in the Open Evangelical tradition of the Church of England.

Notable clergy

 Bulkeley Bandinel, Bodley's Librarian, was rector from 1822 to 1855.
 Eleazar Duncon served as rector from 1633 until stripped of his church appointments during the English Civil War.
 Thomas Le Mesurier, noted polemicist, was rector from 1812 to 1822.
 Joanna Penberthy, the first female bishop in the Church in Wales, served as a deaconess in this parish from 1984 to 1985.
 Noel Proctor, chaplain to HM Prison Manchester during the 1990 Strangeways Prison riot, served his curacy here from 1964 to 1967.
 John Wallis, antiquary and local historian, was a temporary curate in 1775.

References

External links
 Church website
 A Church Near You entry

Church of England church buildings in County Durham
Grade I listed churches in County Durham
12th-century church buildings in England
Saint Andrew